A list of people affiliated with the University of the Sunshine Coast

Alumni
Jarrod Bleijie, politician in the Queensland parliament.
Ashley Noffke, Former professional Australian cricketer 
Brendan Burkett, Paralympic swimmer
Rebecca Creedy, ironwoman and Commonwealth Games swimmer
Karen Foxlee, award-winning novelist
Marayke Jonkers, medal-winning Paralympic swimmer and Queensland Young Achiever 2005
 Kristy Munroe, world Ironwoman title winner and surf lifesaver
 Soo Wincci, Miss World Malaysia 2008, international recording artist, actress, composer, host and entrepreneur

Administration

Chancellors

Vice-Chancellors

Faculty

 Karen Brooks, author, columnist, social commentator and academic
 Brendan Burkett, a medal-winning Paralympic swimming athlete
 Gary Crew, an award-winning author of children's fiction
Chris Sidoti, former member of the Australian Law Reform Commission
 Professor Andrew Vann, a Vice-Chancellor and President at Charles Sturt University

References

Sunshine Coast
 *